Stewart James Edward  (born 1 November 1943) is a New Zealand former cricketer. He trained as a dentist and has been board chairman of the Lakes District Health Board. He played three first-class matches for Otago between 1964 and 1968.

In the 1997 Queen's Birthday Honours, Edward was appointed a Member of the New Zealand Order of Merit, for services to dentistry and the community.

See also
 List of Otago representative cricketers

References

1943 births
Living people
Cricketers from Hamilton, New Zealand
Lakes District Health Board members
Members of the New Zealand Order of Merit
New Zealand dentists
New Zealand justices of the peace
Otago cricketers